AVX-512 are 512-bit extensions to the 256-bit Advanced Vector Extensions SIMD instructions for x86 instruction set architecture (ISA) proposed by Intel in July 2013, and implemented in Intel's Xeon Phi x200 (Knights Landing) and Skylake-X CPUs; this includes the Core-X series (excluding the Core i5-7640X and Core i7-7740X), as well as the new Xeon Scalable Processor Family and Xeon D-2100 Embedded Series. AVX-512 consists of multiple extensions that may be implemented independently. This policy is a departure from the historical requirement of implementing the entire instruction block. Only the core extension AVX-512F (AVX-512 Foundation) is required by all AVX-512 implementations.

Besides widening most 256-bit instructions, the extensions introduce various new operations, such as new data conversions, scatter operations, and permutations. The number of AVX registers is increased from 16 to 32, and eight new "mask registers" are added, which allow for variable selection and blending of the results of instructions. In CPUs with the vector length (VL) extension—included in most AVX-512-capable processors (see )—these instructions may also be used on the 128-bit and 256-bit vector sizes. AVX-512 is not the first 512-bit SIMD instruction set that Intel has introduced in processors: the earlier 512-bit SIMD instructions used in the first generation Xeon Phi coprocessors, derived from Intel's Larrabee project, are similar but not binary compatible and only partially source compatible.

Instruction set
The AVX-512 instruction set consists of several separate sets each having their own unique CPUID feature bit; however, they are typically grouped by the processor generation that implements them.

 F, CD, ER, PF Introduced with Xeon Phi x200 (Knights Landing) and Xeon Gold/Platinum (Skylake SP "Purley"), with the last two (ER and PF) being specific to Knights Landing.
 AVX-512 Foundation (F) expands most 32-bit and 64-bit based AVX instructions with the EVEX coding scheme to support 512-bit registers, operation masks, parameter broadcasting, and embedded rounding and exception control, implemented by Knights Landing and Skylake Xeon
 AVX-512 Conflict Detection Instructions (CD) efficient conflict detection to allow more loops to be vectorized, implemented by Knights Landing and Skylake X
 AVX-512 Exponential and Reciprocal Instructions (ER) exponential and reciprocal operations designed to help implement transcendental operations, implemented by Knights Landing 
 AVX-512 Prefetch Instructions (PF) new prefetch capabilities, implemented by Knights Landing
 VL, DQ, BW Introduced with Skylake X and Cannon Lake.
 AVX-512 Vector Length Extensions (VL) extends most AVX-512 operations to also operate on XMM (128-bit) and YMM (256-bit) registers
 AVX-512 Doubleword and Quadword Instructions (DQ) adds new 32-bit and 64-bit AVX-512 instructions
 AVX-512 Byte and Word Instructions (BW) extends AVX-512 to cover 8-bit and 16-bit integer operations
 IFMA, VBMI Introduced with Cannon Lake.
 AVX-512 Integer Fused Multiply Add (IFMA) – fused multiply add of integers using 52-bit precision.
 AVX-512 Vector Byte Manipulation Instructions (VBMI) adds vector byte permutation instructions which were not present in AVX-512BW.
 4VNNIW, 4FMAPSIntroduced with Knights Mill.
 AVX-512 Vector Neural Network Instructions Word variable precision (4VNNIW) – vector instructions for deep learning, enhanced word, variable precision.
 AVX-512 Fused Multiply Accumulation Packed Single precision (4FMAPS) – vector instructions for deep learning, floating point, single precision.
 VPOPCNTDQ Vector population count instruction. Introduced with Knights Mill and Ice Lake.
 VNNI, VBMI2, BITALGIntroduced with Ice Lake.
 AVX-512 Vector Neural Network Instructions (VNNI) – vector instructions for deep learning.
 AVX-512 Vector Byte Manipulation Instructions 2 (VBMI2) – byte/word load, store and concatenation with shift.
 AVX-512 Bit Algorithms (BITALG) – byte/word bit manipulation instructions expanding VPOPCNTDQ.
 VP2INTERSECT Introduced with Tiger Lake.
 AVX-512 Vector Pair Intersection to a Pair of Mask Registers (VP2INTERSECT).
 GFNI, VPCLMULQDQ, VAESIntroduced with Ice Lake.
 These are not AVX-512 features per se. Together with AVX-512, they enable EVEX encoded versions of GFNI, PCLMULQDQ and AES instructions.

Encoding and features
The VEX prefix used by AVX and AVX2, while flexible, did not leave enough room for the features Intel wanted to add to AVX-512. This has led them to define a new prefix called EVEX.

Compared to VEX, EVEX adds the following benefits:
 Expanded register encoding allowing 32 512-bit registers.
 Adds 8 new opmask registers for masking most AVX-512 instructions.
 Adds a new scalar memory mode that automatically performs a broadcast.
 Adds room for explicit rounding control in each instruction.
 Adds a new compressed displacement memory addressing mode.

The extended registers, SIMD width bit, and opmask registers of AVX-512 are mandatory and all require support from the OS.

SIMD modes
The AVX-512 instructions are designed to mix with 128/256-bit AVX/AVX2 instructions without a performance penalty. However, AVX-512VL extensions allows the use of AVX-512 instructions on 128/256-bit registers XMM/YMM, so most SSE and AVX/AVX2 instructions have new AVX-512 versions encoded with the EVEX prefix which allow access to new features such as opmask and additional registers. Unlike AVX-256, the new instructions do not have new mnemonics but share namespace with AVX, making the distinction between VEX and EVEX encoded versions of an instruction ambiguous in the source code. Since AVX-512F only works on 32- and 64-bit values, SSE and AVX/AVX2 instructions that operate on bytes or words are available only with the AVX-512BW extension (byte & word support).

Extended registers

The width of the SIMD register file is increased from 256 bits to 512 bits, and expanded from 16 to a total of 32 registers ZMM0–ZMM31. These registers can be addressed as 256 bit YMM registers from AVX extensions and 128-bit XMM registers from Streaming SIMD Extensions, and legacy AVX and SSE instructions can be extended to operate on the 16 additional registers XMM16-XMM31 and YMM16-YMM31 when using EVEX encoded form.

Opmask registers
Most AVX-512 instructions may indicate one of 8 opmask registers (k0–k7). For instructions which use a mask register as an opmask, register 'k0' is special: a hardcoded constant used to indicate unmasked operations. For other operations, such as those that write to an opmask register or perform arithmetic or logical operations, 'k0' is a functioning, valid register. In most instructions, the opmask is used to control which values are written to the destination. A flag controls the opmask behavior, which can either be "zero", which zeros everything not selected by the mask, or "merge", which leaves everything not selected untouched. The merge behavior is identical to the blend instructions.

The opmask registers are normally 16 bits wide, but can be up to 64 bits with the AVX-512BW extension. How many of the bits are actually used, though, depends on the vector type of the instructions masked. For the 32-bit single float or double words, 16 bits are used to mask the 16 elements in a 512-bit register. For double float and quad words, at most 8 mask bits are used.

The opmask register is the reason why several bitwise instructions which naturally have no element widths had them added in AVX-512. For instance, bitwise AND, OR or 128-bit shuffle now exist in both double-word and quad-word variants with the only difference being in the final masking.

New opmask instructions
The opmask registers have a new mini extension of instructions operating directly on them. Unlike the rest of the AVX-512 instructions, these instructions are all VEX encoded. The initial opmask instructions are all 16-bit (Word) versions. With AVX-512DQ 8-bit (Byte) versions were added to better match the needs of masking 8 64-bit values, and with AVX-512BW 32-bit (Double) and 64-bit (Quad) versions were added so they can mask up to 64 8-bit values. The instructions KORTEST and KTEST can be used to set the x86 flags based on mask registers, so that they may be used together with non-SIMD x86 branch and conditional instructions.

New instructions in AVX-512 foundation
Many AVX-512 instructions are simply EVEX versions of old SSE or AVX instructions. There are, however, several new instructions, and old instructions that have been replaced with new AVX-512 versions. The new or majorly reworked instructions are listed below. These foundation instructions also include the extensions from AVX-512VL and AVX-512BW since those extensions merely add new versions of these instructions instead of new instructions.

Blend using mask
There are no EVEX-prefixed versions of the blend instructions from SSE4; instead, AVX-512 has a new set of blending instructions using mask registers as selectors. Together with the general compare into mask instructions below, these may be used to implement generic ternary operations or cmov, similar to XOP's VPCMOV.

Since blending is an integral part of the EVEX encoding, these instructions may also be considered basic move instructions. Using the zeroing blend mode, they can also be used as masking instructions.

Compare into mask
AVX-512F has four new compare instructions. Like their XOP counterparts they use the immediate field to select between 8 different comparisons. Unlike their XOP inspiration, however, they save the result to a mask register and initially only support doubleword and quadword comparisons. The AVX-512BW extension provides the byte and word versions. Note that two mask registers may be specified for the instructions, one to write to and one to declare regular masking.

Logical set mask
The final way to set masks is using Logical Set Mask. These instructions perform either AND or NAND, and then set the destination opmask based on the result values being zero or non-zero. Note that like the comparison instructions, these take two opmask registers, one as destination and one a regular opmask.

Compress and expand
The compress and expand instructions match the APL operations of the same name. They use the opmask in a slightly different way from other AVX-512 instructions. Compress only saves the values marked in the mask, but saves them compacted by skipping and not reserving space for unmarked values. Expand operates in the opposite way, by loading as many values as indicated in the mask and then spreading them to the selected positions.

Permute
A new set of permute instructions have been added for full two input permutations. They all take three arguments, two source registers and one index; the result is output by either overwriting the first source register or the index register. AVX-512BW extends the instructions to also include 16-bit (word) versions, and the AVX-512_VBMI extension defines the byte versions of the instructions.

Bitwise ternary logic
Two new instructions added can logically implement all possible bitwise operations between three inputs. They take three registers as input and an 8-bit immediate field. Each bit in the output is generated using a lookup of the three corresponding bits in the inputs to select one of the 8 positions in the 8-bit immediate. Since only 8 combinations are possible using three bits, this allow all possible 3 input bitwise operations to be performed.
These are the only bitwise vector instructions in AVX-512F; EVEX versions of the two source SSE and AVX bitwise vector instructions AND, ANDN, OR and XOR were added in AVX-512DQ.

The difference in the doubleword and quadword versions is only the application of the opmask.

Truth table:

Conversions
A number of conversion or move instructions were added; these complete the set of conversion instructions available from SSE2.

Floating-point decomposition
Among the unique new features in AVX-512F are instructions to decompose floating-point values and handle special floating-point values. Since these methods are completely new, they also exist in scalar versions.

Floating-point arithmetic
This is the second set of new floating-point methods, which includes new scaling and approximate calculation of reciprocal, and reciprocal of square root. The approximate reciprocal instructions guarantee to have at most a relative error of 2−14.

Broadcast

Miscellaneous

New instructions by sets

Conflict detection
The instructions in AVX-512 conflict detection (AVX-512CD) are designed to help efficiently calculate conflict-free subsets of elements in loops that normally could not be safely vectorized.

Exponential and reciprocal
AVX-512 exponential and reciprocal instructions contain more accurate approximate reciprocal instructions than those in the AVX-512 foundation; relative error is at most 2−28. They also contain two new exponential functions that have a relative error of at most 2−23.

Prefetch
AVX-512 prefetch instructions contain new prefetch operations for the new scatter and gather functionality introduced in AVX2 and AVX-512. T0 prefetch means prefetching into level 1 cache and T1 means prefetching into level 2 cache.

4FMAPS and 4VNNIW
The two sets of instructions perform multiple iterations of processing. They are generally only found in Xeon Phi products.

BW, DQ and VBMI
AVX-512DQ adds new doubleword and quadword instructions. AVX-512BW adds byte and words versions of the same instructions, and adds byte and word version of doubleword/quadword instructions in AVX-512F. A few instructions which get only word forms with AVX-512BW acquire byte forms with the AVX-512_VBMI extension (VPERMB, VPERMI2B, VPERMT2B, VPMULTISHIFTQB).

Two new instructions were added to the mask instructions set: KADD and KTEST (B and W forms with AVX-512DQ, D and Q with AVX-512BW). The rest of mask instructions, which had only word forms, got byte forms with AVX-512DQ and doubleword/quadword forms with AVX-512BW. KUNPCKBW was extended to KUNPCKWD and KUNPCKDQ by AVX-512BW.

Among the instructions added by AVX-512DQ are several SSE and AVX instructions that didn't get AVX-512 versions with AVX-512F, among those are all the two input bitwise instructions and extract/insert integer instructions.

Instructions that are completely new are covered below.

Floating-point instructions
Three new floating-point operations are introduced. Since they are not only new to AVX-512 they have both packed/SIMD and scalar versions.

The VFPCLASS instructions tests if the floating-point value is one of eight special floating-point values, which of the eight values will trigger a bit in the output mask register is controlled by the immediate field. The VRANGE instructions perform minimum or maximum operations depending on the value of the immediate field, which can also control if the operation is done absolute or not and separately how the sign is handled. The VREDUCE instructions operate on a single source, and subtract from that the integer part of the source value plus a number of bits specified in the immediate field of its fraction.

Other instructions

VBMI2
Extend VPCOMPRESS and VPEXPAND with byte and word variants. Shift instructions are new.

VNNI
VNNI stands for Vector Neural Network Instructions. AVX512-VNNI adds EVEX-coded instructions described below. With AVX-512F, these instructions can operate on 512-bit vectors, and AVX-512VL further adds support for 128- and 256-bit vectors.

A later AVX-VNNI extension adds VEX encodings of these instructions which can only operate on 128- or 256-bit vectors. AVX-VNNI is not part of the AVX-512 suite, it does not require AVX-512F and can be implemented independently.

IFMA

VPOPCNTDQ and BITALG

VP2INTERSECT

GFNI
EVEX-encoded Galois field new instructions:

VPCLMULQDQ
VPCLMULQDQ with AVX-512F adds an EVEX-encoded 512-bit version of the PCLMULQDQ instruction. With AVX-512VL, it adds EVEX-encoded 256- and 128-bit versions. VPCLMULQDQ alone (that is, on non-AVX512 CPUs) adds only VEX-encoded 256-bit version. (Availability of the VEX-encoded 128-bit version is indicated by different CPUID bits: PCLMULQDQ and AVX.) The wider than 128-bit variations of the instruction perform the same operation on each 128-bit portion of input registers, but they do not extend it to select quadwords from different 128-bit fields (the meaning of imm8 operand is the same: either low or high quadword of the 128-bit field is selected).

VAES
VEX- and EVEX-encoded AES instructions. The wider than 128-bit variations of the instruction perform the same operation on each 128-bit portion of input registers. The VEX versions can be used without AVX-512 support.

BF16
AI acceleration instructions operating on the Bfloat16 numbers.

FP16
An extension of the earlier F16C instruction set, adding comprehensive support for the binary16 floating-point numbers (also known as FP16, float16 or half-precision floating-point numbers). The new instructions implement most operations that were previously available for single and double-precision floating-point numbers and also introduce new complex number instructions and conversion instructions. Scalar and packed operations are supported.

Unlike the single and double-precision format instructions, the half-precision operands are neither conditionally flushed to zero (FTZ) nor conditionally treated as zero (DAZ) based on MXCSR settings. Subnormal values are processed at full speed by hardware to facilitate using the full dynamic range of the FP16 numbers. Instructions that create FP32 and FP64 numbers still respect the MXCSR.FTZ bit.

Arithmetic instructions

Complex arithmetic instructions

Approximate reciprocal instructions

Comparison instructions

Conversion instructions

Decomposition instructions

Move instructions

Legacy instructions with EVEX-encoded versions

CPUs with AVX-512
 Intel
 Knights Landing (Xeon Phi x200): AVX-512 F, CD, ER, PF
 Knights Mill (Xeon Phi x205): AVX-512 F, CD, ER, PF, 4FMAPS, 4VNNIW, VPOPCNTDQ
 Skylake-SP, Skylake-X: AVX-512 F, CD, VL, DQ, BW
 Cannon Lake: AVX-512 F, CD, VL, DQ, BW, IFMA, VBMI
 Cascade Lake: AVX-512 F, CD, VL, DQ, BW, VNNI
 Cooper Lake: AVX-512 F, CD, VL, DQ, BW, VNNI, BF16
 Ice Lake, Rocket Lake: AVX-512 F, CD, VL, DQ, BW, IFMA, VBMI, VBMI2, VPOPCNTDQ, BITALG, VNNI, VPCLMULQDQ, GFNI, VAES
 Tiger Lake (except Pentium and Celeron but some reviewer have the CPU-Z Screenshot of Celeron 6305 with AVX-512 support): AVX-512 F, CD, VL, DQ, BW, IFMA, VBMI, VBMI2, VPOPCNTDQ, BITALG, VNNI, VPCLMULQDQ, GFNI, VAES, VP2INTERSECT
 Alder Lake: AVX-512 F, CD, VL, DQ, BW, IFMA, VBMI, VBMI2, VPOPCNTDQ, BITALG, VNNI, VPCLMULQDQ, GFNI, VAES, BF16, VP2INTERSECT, FP16
 Sapphire Rapids: AVX-512 F, CD, VL, DQ, BW, IFMA, VBMI, VBMI2, VPOPCNTDQ, BITALG, VNNI, VPCLMULQDQ, GFNI, VAES, BF16, FP16
 Centaur Technology
 "CNS" core (8c/8t): AVX-512 F, CD, VL, DQ, BW, IFMA, VBMI
 AMD
 Zen 4: AVX-512 F, CD, VL, DQ, BW, IFMA, VBMI, VBMI2, VPOPCNTDQ, BITALG, VNNI, VPCLMULQDQ, GFNI, VAES, BF16

: The Alder Lake microprocessors contain two different types of cores, only one of which has the silicon units for the AVX-512 family of instructions. The feature is disabled due to lack of support in the Alder Lake E-cores, based on the Gracemont microarchitecture. Older Alder Lake CPUs, with certain motherboards, with specific combinations of BIOS and microcode revisions, can have the instruction set enabled, so long as all cores that do not support the instructions are disabled. In later revisions of Alder Lake microprocessors Intel has physically fused off AVX-512.

Performance

Intel Vectorization Advisor (starting from version 2017) supports native AVX-512 performance and vector code quality analysis (for "Core", Xeon and Intel Xeon Phi processors). Along with traditional hotspots profile, Advisor Recommendations and "seamless" integration of Intel Compiler vectorization diagnostics, Advisor Survey analysis also provides AVX-512 ISA metrics and new AVX-512-specific "traits", e.g. Scatter, Compress/Expand, mask utilization.

On some processors AVX-512 instructions cause a frequency throttling even greater than its predecessors, causing a penalty for mixed workloads. The additional downclocking is triggered by the 512-bit width of vectors and depend on the nature of instructions being executed, and using the 128 or 256-bit part of AVX-512 (AVX-512VL) does not trigger it. As a result, gcc and clang default to prefer using the 256-bit vectors.

See also
 FMA instruction set (FMA)
 XOP instruction set (XOP)
 Scalable Vector Extension for ARM – a new vector instruction set (supplementing VFP and NEON) supporting very wide bit-widths, and single binary code that can adapt automatically to maximum width supported by hardware.

References

 

X86 instructions
SIMD computing

de:Advanced Vector Extensions#Erweiterung AVX-512